Nathan Freke (born 8 September 1983) is a racing driver. He was the 2006 British Formula Ford Champion. Freke has held four British Kart Racing Championship Titles and in 2005 became the only driver ever to win an FIA/CIK Superkart Race in a Division 2 Kart against Division 1 Karts, (50% power differential).

Biography
Freke was born in Hillingdon, England. He lives in Fenny Compton, England.

2006
British Formula Ford Champion. On the way to the title Freke won 10 races, 17 podiums, 18 front row starts, 13 poles and 6 lap records. Freke was one of the 2006 Mclaren – BRDC – Autosport Young Driver of the Year Finalists in his first full year of car racing.

2007
Freke tested in a number of different formula cars such Champ Car Atlantic Series, Formula Three, and Formula BMW, but funding restricted his activities to chassis development for Van Diemen International and Marangoni Tyres. He also competed in the Porsche Carrera Cup and the Dutch Supercar Challenge.

2008
Freke signed for Michael Crawford Motorsports to race in the Firestone Indy Lights Series in 2008, passing his rookie test at Nashville Superspeedway and had his first test on a fast oval at Homestead prior to the first race. He left the team after three races, with a best finish of 8th in the second race at St. Petersburg.

Freke competed in his first endurance race at the Nurburgring 24 hours on the full Nordschleife circuit, finishing 148th in the Marangoni Tyres backed Fiat 500 R after starting 220th.

2009
Freke won the Ginetta G50 Cup supporting the British Touring Car Championship. Out of 28 races Freke, won 15 of them to win the series by 125 points. Freke raced with his own Century Motorsport team, with support from EOS Productions and Hows My Driving. Freke is now looking for a Touring Car drive in 2010 as one of the most successful British racing drivers with a 42% win ratio in all national and international races.

2010
Freke competed in the British GT G4 class with Century Motorsport and team mate Vibe Smed. Finishing 3rd but missing the spa round.

2011
Freke competed in the G55 class of the Ginetta GT Supercup with The Player Century Motorsport car, finishing 4th overall, winning 6 races, 16 podiums, 2 pole positions and 8 fastest laps.

2012
Freke competed in the D3T class of the Nurburgring 24 Hour race winning class in a Jaguar XF-S. Freke also competed in 3 races in the Ginetta GT Supercup winning one and 2 more podiums in the Century Motorsport G55

2013
Freke competed in 2 races in the Ginetta GT Supercup winning both with fastest lap in the Century Motorsport G55. Freke also competed in 3 British GT GT4 races winning one and 2 further podiums in the Century Motorsport G50. An outing in British GT GT3 with Stark Racing ended in a non finish.

2014
Freke competed in 2 races in the Britcar Endurance Championship with Stark Racing winning 1 race and a podium in the other with fastest lap in both races.

2015
Freke competed in GT Cup UK - GTA class finishing 4th overall with 2 wins, 4 podiums and 5 fastest laps. Freke also competed in one race in British GT GT4 class finishing on the podium.

2016
Freke competed in the Dubai 24 hour race in SP3 class, winning on his first attempt. Freke competed in the Bolton University backed car run by Century Motorsport G55 in British GT GT4 class with 1 win, 3 podiums, 1 pole and 1 fastest lap.

2017
Freke competed in his first International Historic race in a Healey 100/4 at the Spa 6 hour classic, winning class with pole position and fastest lap. Freke also competed in the Dubai 24 hour finishing 2nd in the SP3 - GT4 class, he also raced in British GT GT3 class and GT4 class.

Racing record

Complete British GT Championship results
(key) (Races in bold indicate pole position in class) (Races in italics indicate fastest lap in class)

† As Freke was a guest driver, he was ineligible for points.

External links
Nathan Freke – Racing Driver

English racing drivers
1983 births
Indy Lights drivers
Living people
Formula Ford drivers
Sportspeople from Kidderminster
British GT Championship drivers
Porsche Carrera Cup GB drivers
24H Series drivers
Ginetta GT4 Supercup drivers
Nürburgring 24 Hours drivers